Persepolis Rising is a science fiction novel by James S. A. Corey, the pen name of Daniel Abraham and Ty Franck, and the seventh book in their series The Expanse. The title of the novel was announced in September 2016 and the cover was revealed on December 12, 2016.

Plot summary
Twenty-eight years have passed since the events of Babylon's Ashes and Earth is back on its feet after the attack that crippled the planet in Nemesis Games. The crew of the aging gunship Rocinante are still together, working contracts for the Transport Union, who have control of the Ring station and the 1,300 worlds the gates lead to. No one has heard from Admiral Duarte and his rogue fleet in the thirty years since they broke away from the Martian Congressional Republic Navy, until now. They have spent their time in the Laconia system building an advanced fleet using leftover technology from the protomolecule creators. They return through their gate to take over Medina Station and launch an attack on the Sol system.

Characters
 James Holden, aging Captain of the Rocinante, after over 30 years of working the Rocinante, Holden looks to the next chapter of his life, retirement. When the Laconians return through the gate, Holden is drawn back in to the fray. While his companions all escape to lead the resistance against Duarte, he is taken back to Laconia as a captive.
 Bobbie Draper, former Martian Marine and now working on the Rocinante. When Holden retires, Bobbie takes up the mantle of Captain of the Rocinante.
 Camina Drummer, former head of security at Tycho Station, now the president of the Transport Union. The Transport Union's control of Ring station, and the 1,300 worlds it connects to, makes Drummer one of the most powerful people in all of humanity.
 Santiago Jilie Singh, a Captain in the Laconian Navy, recently promoted to command The Gathering Storm. After the Laconians take Medina Station, Singh is appointed as the governor of the station.
 Naomi Nagata, one of the best engineers in the solar system and XO of the Rocinante, she is looking forward to a quiet retirement alongside Holden, until the Laconians return and Naomi gets pulled in to the resistance with the rest of the crew of the Rocinante.
 Alex Kamal, pilot of the Rocinante, after another failed marriage, and a son who is in university, Alex is still at the helm of the Rocinante, with no plans of leaving.
 Amos Burton, mechanic on the Rocinante, still very close friends with Clarissa, Amos has become her caretaker as her health is declining.
 Clarissa Mao, daughter of the disgraced Jules-Pierre Mao and former prisoner on Earth, now a mechanic on the Rocinante alongside Amos. Clarissa's health is deteriorating due to the body modification implants she got over thirty years ago, during her quest to destroy Holden and restore her father's good name. During the final assault to steal the Storm she activates her mods one final time and is killed by a combination of the chemicals being released and injuries received in the fighting.
 Paolo Cortázar, a former member of Protogen's nanoinformatics research division who was a prisoner of the OPA after the raid on Thoth Station. He was released by rogue members of the OPA, and has been working with the rogue Martian fleet under Admiral Duarte ever since. He is the lead researcher on Laconia and is working on making Duarte immortal using protomolecule technology.
 Winston Duarte, a former Commander in the Martian Congressional Republic Navy, until he and a splinter group broke away from Mars and went through the ring gate to the planet Laconia, where he was awarded the rank of Admiral in the newborn Laconian Navy. Duarte learned of Laconia and the vast amount of protomolecule technology that was left behind by the creators through his position at the MCRN, and felt that it needed to be acquired and understood, in the event that the race that destroyed the protomolecule builders returned. He sees himself as a Philosopher King who will lead humanity to victory over whatever destroyed the Protomolecule builders. To achieve this and avoid problems with succession he has begun treatments to make himself immortal.

Reception 
A review on Elitist Book Reviews praised the characterization in the novel, saying "Characterization in this book was on point. In fact, it’s likely the best they’ve done in the series. There were so many moments that had me holding my breath, or whispering “no…”, and seriously tearing up." Andrew Liptak of The Verge was slightly critical of the book, however, saying "[Persepolis Rising] does fall short in some places. The Laconians feel too much like a stereotypical evil empire, complete with super weapons and armored foot soldiers. Singh himself feels particularly naïve — it should be obvious why governments don’t want to accept Laconian rule. One would think a powerful military power would have a more realistic understanding of invasion forces and dealing with insurgencies. Even if the series is reaching for new stakes in its final arc, it’s less interesting than the nuanced politics of past books."

Niall Alexander of Tor.com praised the dark tones and themes of the novel, saying "Though the seventh part of The Expanse opens on an unusually hopeful note, with humanity writ large finally united and our ever-hopeful heroes planning happy retirements, Persepolis Rising is ultimately among the darkest chapters of this insatiable saga. It takes a little longer than I’d like to get going, but when it does, Persepolis Rising proves as pulse-pounding and poignant as any of its powerful predecessors, and given how near the end is from here, I don’t expect there to be another dull moment before the whole story’s over."

Short story

"Auberon" 

"Auberon" is a short story published by James S. A Corey set between Persepolis Rising and its sequel Tiamat's Wrath on November 12, 2019. It consists of 63 pages. The novella was received well, with an average rating on Goodreads of 4.5 stars.

References

External links
 

2017 American novels
American science fiction novels
Novels by James S. A. Corey
Space opera novels
The Expanse
Orbit Books books